Christiana High School (CHS) is a public high school in unincorporated New Castle County, Delaware and has a Newark postal address. It is a part of the Christiana School District. CHS serves a portion of Wilmington including the Shipley Run and West 9th Street historic districts and in the suburbs it serves parts of Brookside and Bear.

History
Founded in 1963, Christiana High School is one of three traditional high schools in the Christina School District, the other two being Newark High School and Glasgow High School. It is located outside of Newark near the University of Delaware.

Curriculum
CHS' curriculum focuses on agricultural and health sciences. In accordance with the State of Delaware, Christiana students must complete the following credits to be eligible for graduation: 4.5 credits of electives; 4 credits of English and math; 3 credits of science and social studies; 2 language credits; 1 credit of physical education and an additional science or social studies course; and 0.5 health credit. They must also complete the Senior Project and Student Success Plan (SSP) 3 credits of the Career Pathways program. Seniors are required to complete a cross-disciplinary research project.

In 2004, the Christiana School District was awarded a federal grant to create smaller learning communities to help improve the overall high school experience for students.

CHS was named a National Blue Ribbon School in 1984.

Alumni
George N. Parks (class of 1971) - Former director of the University of Massachusetts Minuteman Marching Band
Jamie Duncan- Former NFL player drafted by the Tampa Bay Buccaneers; two-time NCAA All-American and SEC Defensive Player of the Year at Vanderbilt University
Niem Green (class of 2001), rapper, author, and entrepreneur 
Frank Masley, three-time Olympian (1980, 1984, and 1988) in luge
Leon Mackey, football player for the NFL and AFL; currently a free agent
Sap, hip hop producer and rapper

References

External links
Official Christiana High School website

High schools in New Castle County, Delaware
Public high schools in Delaware
Educational institutions established in 1963
1963 establishments in Delaware